Diamond Cut may refer to:
 Diamond cut
 Diamond Cut (Bonnie Tyler album), 1979
 Diamond Cut (Tia Fuller album), 2018

See also

 Diamond Cut Productions, an American company